This is a list of New Zealand billionaires based on an annual assessment of wealth and assets compiled and published by Forbes magazine in 2022.

2022 New Zealand billionaires list

See also
 The World's Billionaires
 List of countries by the number of billionaires

References

Lists of people by wealth
Net worth
 
Economy of New Zealand-related lists